The following is an incomplete list of festivals in Taiwan, of all types.

Festivals in Taiwan
Pulima Art Festival
Simple Life Festival
Taipei International TV Market & Forum
Taiwan Lantern Festival
Taiwan Youth Day

Film festivals in Taiwan

Golden Horse Film Festival and Awards
Kaohsiung Film Festival
Taipei Film Festival
Taiwan International Documentary Festival
Taiwan International Ethnographic Film Festival
Taiwan International Queer Film Festival
Women Make Waves

Folk festivals in Taiwan
Double Ninth Festival
Double Third Festival
Flying fish festival
Ghost Festival
Harvest Festival
Mid-Autumn Festival
Weiya
Yilan International Children's Folklore and Folkgame Festival

Garden festivals in Taiwan
Taichung World Flora Exposition
Taipei International Flora Exposition

Music festivals in Taiwan

Amis Music Festival
Beigang International Music Festival
Formoz Festival
Hohaiyan Rock Festival
Megaport Music Festival
Spring Scream
Taichung Jazz Festival
Taroko Music Festival

Religious festivals in Taiwan
Dongzhi Festival
Lantern Festival
Qing Shan King Sacrificial Ceremony

See also
List of festivals in Asia#Taiwan

External links

 

 

Festivals
Taiwan
 Taiwan
 Taiwan
 Festivals